John 'Jack' Smart was a professional footballer who played for Bristol Rovers and Reading in the early twentieth century. He was born in Kingswood in what is now South Gloucestershire and after starting out with Bristol East went on to play 105 games for Bristol Rovers in the Southern League, scoring twice. He moved to Reading from Rovers in 1910.

Sources

Year of birth missing
Year of death missing
People from Kingswood, South Gloucestershire
English footballers
Association football midfielders
Bristol Rovers F.C. players
Reading F.C. players
Sportspeople from Gloucestershire
Bristol East F.C. players